James Bauer (1884–1940) was a German film director. Following the Nazi takeover of power in 1933, he emigrated first to Spain and later to Argentina, where he directed several films until his death in 1940.

Selected filmography
 The Black Star (1922)
 The Sleeping Volcano (1922)
 Der Mitternachtszug (1923)
 Op Hoop van Zegen (1924)
 Anne-Liese of Dessau (1925)
 Walpurgisnacht (1927)
 Did You Fall in Love Along the Beautiful Rhine? (1927)
 The Foreign Legionnaire (1928)
 The Girl from the Provinces (1929)
 Incest (1929)
 The Third Confession (1929)
 Night Convoy (1932)
 The Escape to Nice (1932)
 Paraguay, tierra de promisión (1937)
 Cantando llegó el amor (1938)
 El misterio de la dama gris  (1939) 
 Explosivo 008 (1940)

Bibliography
 Bergfelder, Tim & Bock, Hans-Michael. The Concise Cinegraph: Encyclopedia of German. Berghahn Books, 2009.
 Prawer, S.S. Between Two Worlds: The Jewish Presence in German and Austrian Film, 1910-1933''. Berghahn Books, 2007.

External links
 

1884 births
1940 deaths
Film directors from Hamburg
Jewish emigrants from Nazi Germany to Argentina